Claudio Bonanni (born 5 March 1997) is an Italian professional footballer who plays as a defender or a defensive midfielder for BOV Challenge League club Marsaxlokk.

Career
Bonanni started his senior career with A.C. Milan. After that, he played for Pavia, Varese Calcio, and U.S. Folgore Caratese A.S.D. In 2018, he signed for Kamza in the Albanian Superliga, where he made eighteen appearances and scored one goal. In July 2022, Bonanni joined Bulgarian club Hebar.

References

External links 
 
 
 I'll tell you about Albanian football - Interview with Claudio Bonanni
 Bonanni: "Team removed, little money ... but what an experience in Albania"
 Claudio Bonanni: “In Malta it is real football. Too much Coronavirus panic ”
 From Milan to Kamza, the Italian Bonani: An interesting experience in Albania, I guarantee protection
 Bonani: Kamza will survive, here is the championship with which I compare Superiore

1997 births
Living people
Italian footballers
Italian expatriate footballers
Expatriate footballers in Albania
Expatriate footballers in Malta
A.C. Milan players
F.C. Pavia players
S.S.D. Varese Calcio players
U.S. Folgore Caratese A.S.D. players
FC Kamza players
Birkirkara F.C. players
Association football defenders